Centrilobular necrosis refers to the necrosis of the centrilobular tissue of the hepatic lobule. The centrilobular zone of the lobule is most prone to metabolic toxins such as those generated in alcoholic hepatitis. In acetaminophen overdose, glutathione depletion occurs and the highly reactive NAPQI will bind to the liver cells causing centrilobular necrosis.

References

Necrosis